Xylulose is a ketopentose, a monosaccharide containing five carbon atoms, and including a ketone functional group.  It has the chemical formula .  In nature, it occurs in both the L- and D-enantiomers. 1-Deoxyxylulose is a precursor to terpenes via the DOXP pathway.

Pathology 
L-Xylulose accumulates in the urine in patients with pentosuria, due to a deficiency in L-xylulose reductase. Since L-xylulose is a reducing sugar like D-glucose, pentosuria patients have been wrongly diagnosed in the past to be diabetic.

References 

Ketopentoses